Noire is the tenth studio album by the Irish alternative electronic band VNV Nation, released on October 12, 2018, in Europe under Anachron Sounds, and on December 7, 2018, in America under Metropolis Records.

Reception

Electrozombies International Synthpop Magazine's Annika Autzen wrote "Ronan Harris’ melancholic and calm voice leads the listener through very dark places, where opposing forces such as light and darkness, peace and war, life and death, love and hate are intertwined in an eternal conflict. The religious implications in the lyrics add to this somber atmosphere and make listening to the 13 songs an almost transcendental experience."

Release Music Magazine's Johan Carlsson wrote "Ronan sings better than ever, solemnly painting a picture of a dark future, and some tracks have melodies that just get stuck in your head and twirl around for hours. [...] Ronan manages to wring a lot of emotion and beauty from his machine park, which is no small feat."

Track listing
All songs written and composed by Ronan Harris.

Personnel
VNV Nation
 Ronan Harris – vocals, programming
Additional performers
 Conrad Oleak - orchestral programming on "All Our Sins" outro
 Szymon Jakubowski - piano on "Nocturne No.7"

Charts

References

External links
 Album Review by ReGen Magazine, 9 September 2019

2018 albums
VNV Nation albums